Crack in the Mirror is a 1960 drama film directed by Richard Fleischer. The three principal actors, Orson Welles, Juliette Gréco, and Bradford Dillman, play dual roles in two interconnected stories as the participants in two love triangles.

The script was credited to by producer Darryl F. Zanuck (under his frequent pseudonym "Mark Canfield"), but in his 1993 autobiography Just Tell Me When to Cry, Fleischer revealed that it was ghostwritten by the blacklisted Jules Dassin.

Plot
In a run-down Paris dwelling, an angry Hagolin accuses mistress Eponine of seeing a man named Larnier behind his back. In a party at a stately home, prosperous attorney Lamerciere's guests include his longtime mistress Florence and his young law partner Claude.

Eponine attempts to murder Hagolin but fails. Larnier intervenes on her behalf and Eponine strangles the man with a scarf. The body is dismembered and dumped, then Eponine is placed under arrest.

Claude, who is secretly Florence's lover, feels that he deserves credit for much of Lamerciere's courtroom success. He leaps at the opportunity when Eponine asks him to defend her. Lamerciere remarks that Claude and Florence could do to him exactly what the accused woman and lover Larnier did to Hagolin.

In court, Lamerciere persuades Claude to allow him to deliver the closing argument. He paints such a lurid picture of Eponine's crime that results in her conviction. His gaze at Florence makes it clear that he knows that she has been unfaithful.

Cast
 Orson Welles as Hagolin/Lamerciere
 Juliette Gréco as Eponine/Florence
 Bradford Dillman as Larnier/Claude
 Alexander Knox as President
 Catherine Lacey as Mother Superior
 William Lucas as Kerstner
 Maurice Teynac as Doctor
 Austin Willis as Hurtelaut
 Cec Linder as Murzeau
 Eugene Deckers as Magre

Reception
In a contemporary review for The New York Times, critic Howard Thompson wrote: "A determined try for something different—three performers playing six roles, as two adulterous triangles explode in a murder trial—misfires coldly and rather hollowly ... There is certainly no cause to evaluate this extremely devious, visual charade by such a brilliant courtroom yardstick as 'Compulsion,' also involving director Fleischer, Messrs. Welles and Dillman and the Zanuck production banner. ... [T]he picture is a peculiarly bloodless affair (for all the lovingly detailed gore of the murder), archly juggling some arid dialogue and even the characterizations."

In a letter to the editors of Playboy magazine in April 1967, Darryl F. Zanuck, president of 20th Century-Fox Film Corporation, observed that "when I won three prizes for a very second-rate film called Crack in the Mirror," at the Cannes Film Festival, "[t]his dubious victory was achieved by the political activities of a group of friends who accompanied me to the festival (Orson Welles, Juliette Gréco and Françoise Sagan)."

See also
 List of American films of 1960

References

External links

 
 
 

1960 films
1960 crime drama films
American black-and-white films
American courtroom films
Films directed by Richard Fleischer
1960 romantic drama films
20th Century Fox films
American romantic drama films
Films produced by Darryl F. Zanuck
Films scored by Maurice Jarre
1960s English-language films
1960s American films